Groth is a German surname. Notable people with the surname include:

Annette Groth (born 1954), German politician
Erik Groth (born 1975), American businessman
Ernest Groth (1922–2004), baseball player
Gary Groth (born 1954), American comic book editor, publisher, and critic
Henrik Groth (1903–1983), Norwegian publisher and essayist
Jacob Groth (born 1951), Danish film composer
Jarmila Groth (born 1987), Slovak-Australian tennis player
Jeff Groth (American football) (born 1957), American football player
Jeff Groth (film editor), film and television editor
Johnny Groth (born 1926), baseball player
Klaus Groth (1819–1899), German poet
Martin Groth (born 1969), German football player
Paul Heinrich von Groth (1843–1927), German mineralogist
René Groth (born 1972), German football player
Samuel Groth (born 1987), Australian tennis player
Stephen Fazekas de St. Groth, Hungarian-Australia microbiologist
Stephan Groth (born 1971), Danish musician, Apoptygma Berzerk
Sylvester Groth (born 1958), German actor and tenor
Wilhelm Groth (1904–1977), German physical chemist
Nikolaj Groth (born  in 1994) Danish actor

See also
The extended Groth Strip, an image of a small region in the constellation Ursa Major 

German-language surnames